CTGU may refer to:

Chongqing Three Gorges University
China Three Gorges University